Polygala youngii is a plant species in the milkwort family (Polygalaceae). It is a -tall annual herb with very thin stems. The flowers it produces may be yellowish, pink, or blue.

References

youngii